The Miss Ecuador 1980 was held on March 20, 1980. There were 18 candidates for the national title. At the end of the night, Ana Plaza from Guayas crowned Verónica Rivas as Miss Ecuador 1980. The Miss Ecuador competed in Miss Universe 1980.

Results

Placements

Special awards

Contestants

Casting

A casting was held in 1980 to select an ecuadorian representative to compete at Miss World 1980.

Notes

Debuts

 Bolívar

Returns

Last compete in:

1960
 El Oro
1965
 Napo
1975
 Esmeraldas
1974
 Galápagos
 Imbabura
 Los Ríos

Withdrawals

 Loja
 Pastaza

External links

Miss Ecuador
1980 beauty pageants
Beauty pageants in Ecuador
1980 in Ecuador